Sorbo is a frazione of Tagliacozzo, in the Province of L'Aquila in the Abruzzo, region of Italy. It is located 45 miles (72 kilometres) north east of Rome.

Frazioni of Tagliacozzo